Eurovision: Europe Shine a Light was a live television programme, organised by the European Broadcasting Union (EBU) and produced by the Dutch broadcasters NPO, NOS and AVROTROS. It replaced the Eurovision Song Contest 2020, which was planned to be held in Rotterdam, Netherlands, but was cancelled due to the COVID-19 pandemic.

The show was broadcast live from Hilversum, Netherlands on 16 May 2020 and lasted for approximately two hours. It was hosted by Chantal Janzen, Edsilia Rombley and Jan Smit, who had been chosen to present the Eurovision Song Contest 2020 before its cancellation.

The EBU reported that the show had an audience of 73 million viewers, based on data provided by 38 of the 45 countries that broadcast the programme. In April 2021, the show was nominated for a Rockie Award in the category Comedy & Variety.

Background

As the Eurovision Song Contest 2020 could not take place due to the outbreak of COVID-19 in Europe, the EBU decided to organise Eurovision: Europe Shine a Light as an alternative programme to fill the space that was initially planned for the competition. The programme's name was inspired by the song "Love Shine a Light" by Katrina and the Waves, which won the Eurovision Song Contest 1997.

This was the fourth time that the EBU organised a special show in the Eurovision format, after the shows for the 25th, 50th and 60th anniversaries. Like the 25th and 60th anniversary shows, this was a non-competitive show.

Format
During the programme, all 41 songs that had been chosen to take part in the Eurovision Song Contest 2020 were honoured in a non-competitive format. Participants from the past were invited to make an appearance. Johnny Logan, the hosts and Eurovision fans who uploaded clips for the occasion sang Logan's "What's Another Year", which won the Eurovision Song Contest 1980 in The Hague. Closing the show, all artists (except Hooverphonic, representing Belgium) performed "Love Shine a Light" from their respective home countries. The show ends with the announcement that Rotterdam would remain as the host city for the Eurovision Song Contest 2021.

Location
On 1 April 2020, Hilversum was confirmed as the host city for the event, with Studio 21 in the Hilversum Media Park as the venue of the show. It was the second time Hilversum hosted a Eurovision event, having previously hosted the Eurovision Song Contest 1958.

Presenters

The show was hosted by three presenters: actress and television host Chantal Janzen, singer and commentator for the contest Jan Smit, and singer Edsilia Rombley, who represented the Netherlands in the 1998 and 2007 contests. They would have been the three hosts of the Eurovision Song Contest 2020. Beauty vlogger Nikkie de Jager, also known as NikkieTutorials, presented the show's online content.

Contents

Performances
The show featured performances from the following Eurovision artists:

Song Celebration
The show also showcased the artists and songs that would have competed at the Eurovision Song Contest 2020, by showing short excerpts of the songs' music videos or stage performances, along with video messages from the artists themselves. These were as follows:

Appearances

 Viki Gabor
 Alexander Rybak
 Lenny Kuhr
 Sandra Kim
 Anne-Marie David
 Niamh Kavanagh
 Getty Kaspers
 Ell & Nikki
 Sergey Lazarev
 Dana
 Helena Paparizou
 Carola
 Conchita Wurst
 Björn Ulvaeus
 Graham Norton

Landmarks
Various landmarks in countries that were set to compete were illuminated as part of a segment titled Europe Shine a Landmark. The following landmarks were featured in the programme:

Czech Republic, Finland and Moldova were the only countries that did not have a landmark featured.

Broadcasters and commentators
The show took place on 16 May 2020 at 21:00 CEST. The following countries broadcast the live show:

Viewing figures

See also
Eurovision Song Contest 2020
Der kleine Song Contest
Sveriges 12:a
Eurovision 2020 – das deutsche Finale
Free European Song Contest

Notes

References

External links

2020 in Dutch television
Television shows about the Eurovision Song Contest
Nostalgia television shows
Eurovision Song Contest 2020
2020 in the Netherlands
2020 in music
2020 television specials
May 2020 events in Europe
Television shows about the COVID-19 pandemic
Events in Hilversum
Music in Hilversum